Kalawa may refer to:

Kalawa people, an ethnic group of Australia
Calau, known in Lower Sorbian as Kalawa, a town in Germany
Kalawa, a subdivision of Makueni County, Kenya
Kaława, a village in Poland

See also
 Kalawa Jazmee Records, a South African record label